Esmailiyeh-ye Yek (also Romanized as Esmā‘īlīyeh-ye Yek) is a village in Muran Rural District, in the Soveyseh District of Karun County, Khuzestan Province, Iran. At the 2006 census, its population was 603, in 122 families.

References 

Populated places in Karun County